Wang Prachan Road or National highway 4184 is a major road in Satun Province of Thailand. It connects to Malaysia's R15 ( in the state of Perlis ).

List of junctions and towns

References

National highways in Thailand